Calluga purpureoviridis is a moth in the family Geometridae. It is found in New Guinea.

References

External links

Moths described in 1903
Eupitheciini
Moths of New Guinea
Endemic fauna of New Guinea